Vittorio Villano (born 2 February 1988) is a Belgian football player who currently plays for AFC Tubize in Belgium. His position is in the right side of the midfield.

References

External links

 Vittorio Villano Interview

1988 births
Living people
Belgian footballers
Standard Liège players
A.F.C. Tubize players

Association football midfielders